Robert Gemert (born August 7, 1951) is a Surinamese former footballer who played as a forward.

Career 
Gemert played in the North American Soccer League in 1976 with Toronto Metros-Croatia. He also played with the team during the indoor season. In 1977, he played in the National Soccer League with Toronto Italia. In 1978, he returned to the North American Soccer League to sign with Rochester Lancers. On April 19, 1978, the Lancers released him from his contract. For the remainder of the 1978 season, he returned to the NSL to play with the Buffalo Blazers.

In the winter of 1979, he played in the Major Indoor Soccer League with the Buffalo Stallions. In 1981, he returned to the National Soccer League to play with Hamilton Steelers. He had another stint with Hamilton in the Canadian Soccer League during the 1989 season.

References  

1951 births
Living people
Surinamese footballers
Association football forwards
Toronto Blizzard (1971–1984) players
Toronto Italia players
Rochester Lancers (1967–1980) players
Buffalo Stallions players
Hamilton Steelers (1981–1992) players
North American Soccer League (1968–1984) indoor players
North American Soccer League (1968–1984) players
Canadian National Soccer League players
Major Indoor Soccer League (1978–1992) players
People from Paramaribo
Canadian Soccer League (1987–1992) players